Jinzhou Bay Airport  is an airport serving the city of Jinzhou in western Liaoning province of Northeast China. It is located in Jianye Township, Linghai city. The airport received approval from the State Council of China in November 2012. The projected total investment is 762 million yuan.

The airport was opened on 10 December 2015, when all flights serving Jinzhou were transferred from the old Jinzhou Xiaolingzi Airport, which became a dedicated military airport.

Facilities
The airport has a 2,500-meter runway (class 4C) and a 7,200-square-meter terminal building. It is projected to handle 550,000 passengers and 3,750 tons of cargo annually.

Airlines and destinations

See also
List of airports in China
List of the busiest airports in China

References

Airports in Liaoning
Airports established in 2015
2015 establishments in China
Jinzhou